New Athens is the name of several towns in the United States:

New Athens, Illinois
New Athens, Ohio

New Athens is also the English name of Nowe Ateny, the first Polish-language encyclopedia.

See also
 A New Athens (disambiguation)